Laurance "Larry" Piturro (born October 31, 1969 in Yonkers, New York) is a retired American soccer defender and coach.  He spent eight years with the Long Island Rough Riders and three with the Westchester Flames. He was also the head coach of the Concordia College, Bronxville women’s soccer team from 2000 to 2007.

Player
Piturro began his collegiate career at Westchester Community College where he was a 1988 Second Team JUCO All American soccer player.  He then transferred to Southern Connecticut State University, playing on the men’s soccer team in 1989 and 1990.  In 1993 and 1994, he played for the Connecticut Wolves.  In 1995, he played twenty regular season games with the Long Island Rough Riders as they won the USISL championship. In February 1996, the Columbus Crew selected Piturro in the 14th round (131st overall) of the 1996 MLS Inaugural Player Draft but was not signed by the team. He remained with Long Island until 2001 when it was in the USL A-League.  That spring, he played for the Tampa Bay Mutiny in pre-season exhibition games. In 2002, he moved to the Westchester Flames. In 2005, he returned to the Rough Riders for one more season before retiring.

Coach
On November 2, 1998, Concordia College, Bronxville hired Piturro as an assistant coach for the women’s soccer team.  He became head coach in August 2000.

References

External links
 Long Island Rough Riders All Time Stats

1969 births
Living people
American soccer coaches
American soccer players
Connecticut Wolves players
Long Island Rough Riders players
Southern Connecticut Fighting Owls men's soccer players
USISL players
A-League (1995–2004) players
Westchester Flames players
USL League Two players
Concordia College (New York)
Association football defenders